The monarchy of Lithuania concerned the monarchical head of state of Lithuania, which was established as an absolute and hereditary monarchy. Throughout Lithuania's history there were three ducal dynasties that managed to stay in power—House of Mindaugas, the House of Gediminas, and the House of Jagiellon. Despite this, the one and only King of Lithuania who has ever been crowned was King Mindaugas I, although there were two more instances of royal nobles who were not officially crowned due to unfortunate political circumstances, but de jure received recognition abroad as kings of Lithuania from the pope or the Holy Roman emperor—Vytautas the Great by Sigismund of Luxembourg and Mindaugas II by Pope Benedict XV, respectively. Others were seen as kings of Lithuania even though they had only considered it and never took further action to claim the throne, as in the case of Gediminas who was recognised as King of Lithuania by Pope John XXII. The hereditary monarchy in Lithuania was first established in the 13th century during the reign of Mindaugas I and officially re-established as a constitutional monarchy on 11 July 1918, only to be abandoned soon afterwards on 2 November 1918.

The Lithuanian monarchs were being inaugurated in the Vilnius Cathedral until 1569 by placing the Gediminas' Cap on their heads.

Lithuania in the present day is a representative democracy in a semi-presidential system based on popular sovereignty, as defined in the current Constitution of Lithuania, and has no monarchy.

Titles

King 
The full title held by King of Lithuania from 1253 to 1263 was:

In Lithuanian: Iš Dievo malonės, Lietuvos karalius

In Latin: Dei Gratia Rex Lettowiae

In English: By the Grace of God, King of the Lithuania

The first mention of a Lithuanian King, however, predates the formation of the state itself: according to Livonian Rhymed Chronicle, Mindaugas' father was a great king who "had no equal in his time." As the territory of Lithuania expanded eastwards, other king-titled grand dukes who ruled the country adopted similar titles for introducing themselves abroad. For instance, Grand Duke of Lithuania Vytenis was sometimes regarded as Rex Lethowinorum (King of Lithuanians) while his successor Gediminas took the Latin title of Rex Lithuanorum et Multorum Ruthenorum (King of Lithuanians and many Ruthenians). Teutonic Knights referred to Algirdas and his wife Uliana (Julijona) as "Grand King of Lithuania" and "Grand Queen of Lithuania". Even though it is traditionally accepted that Mindaugas was the only true king, all historical records, with the exception of Slavic annals, mention Lithuanian rulers as kings until 1386.

Grand Duke 
Officially, the title of Grand Duke of Lithuania was introduced after the Pact of Horodło in 1413. Until then, previous monarchs were called by different titles, including kings. This was because in Lithuania, unlike in the majority of other European monarchies, the Grand Duke was a sovereign monarch who was accountable to no one, thus de facto king. The full title of Grand Duke of Lithuania was:

In Lithuanian: Lietuvos didysis kunigaikštis

In Latin: Magnus Dux Lithuaniae

In English: Grand Duke of the Lithuania

Following the Act of Krėva with Poland in 1385, the full Latin title was changed to Dei Gratia Rex Poloniae Magnus Dux Lithuaniae (By the Grace of God, King of Poland and Grand Duke of Lithuania).

List of monarchs of Lithuania

House of Mindaugas (1236–1267) 

|-
|King 1236–1253  (as Grand Duke)   1253–1263 (as King)||  || Son of mythological Ringaudas || NN, sister of Morta  2 children  Morta  2 children || 1263  Aglona  Assassinated by Treniota  and Daumantas  Aged about 60 || Right of conquest  Son of mythological Ringaudas
|-
|Grand Duke 1263–1264||  || Unknown Son of NN,  Mindaugas' sister  and Vykintas || Unknown  1 child || 1264  Murdered by servants  loyal to Mindaugas' son Vaišvilkas || Right of conquest  Nephew of Mindaugas
|-
|Grand DukeLaurušas 1264–1267||  || Unknown Son of Mindaugasand Morta || Unmarried and  childless||  1268  Was murdered  by Leo I of Galicia || Right of conquest  Son of Mindaugas
|-
|}

House of Monomakh (1267–1269) 

|-
|Grand Duke 1267–1269||||   Halych Son of Daniel of Galicia  || NN, daughter of Mindaugas  No children ||   Kholm  Aged about 39 || Offered by Vaišvilkas  Brother-in-law  of Vaišvilkas
|-
|}

House of Mindaugas (1269–1285) 

|-
|Grand Duke 1270–1282|||| 1220 || Ona of Masovia  1 child|| 1282  Kernavė  Aged 62 || Right of conquest  Possibly a relative  of Mindaugas
|-
|Grand Duke 1282–1285|| || Unknown ||Unknown || 3 March 1285  Died in a battle by Tver || Possibly a son  of Mindaugas
|-
|}

House of Gediminas (1285–1440) 

|-
|Grand Duke 1285–1291||  || None known || Unknown  Son of  Skalmantas (?) || Unknown ||1291 || Possibly a relative  of Daumantas
|-
|Grand Duke 1291–1295|| || None known || Unknown  Son of  Skalmantas (?) || Unknown ||  || Brother of Butigeidis
|-
|Grand Duke 1295–1316|||| None known || 1260 Son of Butvydas || Vikinda  1 child|| 1316  Aged 56 || Son of Butvydas
|- 
|Grand Duke 1316–1341|||| None known ||  Son of Butvydas || Jaunė 13 children ||   Raudonė  Aged about 66 || Son of Butvydas
|-
|Grand Duke 1341–1345|||| None known ||  Son of Gediminasand Jaunė|| Unknown  3 children ||   Aged 57−60 || Son of Gediminas
|-
|Grand Duke   (Diarchy with Kęstutis)   1345–1377 ||||  ||  Son of Gediminasand Jaunė||  Maria of Vitebsk  6 children   Uliana of Tver  8 children||   Maišiagala  Aged about 81 || Right of conquest  Son of Gediminas
|-
|Grand Duke   (Diarchy with Kęstutis)  May 1377–August 1381||||  ||   Vilnius Son of Algirdasand Uliana of Tver ||  Jadwiga of Poland  No children   Anna of Cilli  1 child   Elizabeth Granowska  No children   Sophia of Halshany  2 children || 1 June 1434  Gródek Jagielloński  Aged 72−82 || Son of Algirdas
|-
|Grand Duke  1381–1382 ||  ||  ||   Senieji Trakai Son of Gediminasand Jaunė|| Birutė  3 children|| 1382  Kreva  Murdered by the  order of Jogaila while imprisoned  Aged 84–85 || Right of conquest  Son of Gediminas
|-
|Grand Duke  3 August 1382–1 June 1434||||  ||   Vilnius Son of Algirdasand Uliana of Tver ||  Jadwiga of Poland  No children   Anna of Cilli  1 child   Elizabeth Granowska  No children   Sophia of Halshany  2 children || 1 June 1434  Gródek Jagielloński  Aged 72−82 || Right of conquest  Son of Algirdas
|-
|-
! colspan="7" |Act of Kreva signed in 1385Poland and Lithuania de jure are ruled by one monarch but remain to be separate states.
|-
|King of Poland and Grand Duke  3 August 1382–1 June 1434||||  ||   Vilnius Son of Algirdasand Uliana of Tver ||  Jadwiga of Poland  No children   Anna of Cilli  1 child   Elizabeth Granowska  No children   Sophia of Halshany  2 children || 1 June 1434  Gródek Jagielloński  Aged 72−82 || Son of Algirdas
|-
|-
|Grand Duke  1386–1392 |||| ||   Vilnius Son of Algirdasand Uliana of Tver || Unmarried  and childless || 11 January 1397  Kyiv  Possibly poisoned  by the order of the  Russian Orthodox priests  Aged 43−44 || Offered by Jogaila  Son of Algirdas  Removed by Jogaila
|-
|-
! colspan="7" |Astrava Agreement signed in 1392Following the Lithuanian Civil War, Vytautas and his successors de jure  act as regents of the King of Poland until 1440.
|-
|Grand DukeKing-elect of LithuaniaVytautas the Great4 August 1392–27 October 1430||||  ||   Senieji Trakai Son of Kęstutisand Birutė ||  Anna  1 child   Uliana Olshanska  No children || 27 October 1430  Trakai  Aged about 80 || Offered by Jogaila  Son of Kęstutis
|-
|Grand Duke October 1430–1 August 1432||||   || Before 1370  Vilnius Son of Algirdasand Uliana of Tver || Anna of Tver  1 child || 10 February 1452  Lutsk  Aged about 82 || Son of Algirdas
|-
|Grand Duke 1432–1440 ||||   || 1365  Trakai Son of Kęstutisand Birutė|| Unknown 1 child|| 20 March 1440  Trakai  Murdered by supporters  of Švitrigaila  Aged 75 || Son of Kęstutis
|-
|}

House of Jagiellon (1440–1569) 

|-
|King of Poland and Grand Duke   29 June 1440–7 June 1492||||   || 30 November 1427  Kraków Son of Jogaila Algirdaitisand Sophia of Halshany || Elisabeth of Austria  12 children || 7 June 1492  Old Grodno Castle  Aged 64 || Son of Jogaila
|- 1263 –  1265||||||  ||
|King of Poland and Grand Duke   30 July 1492–19 August 1506||||   || 5 August 1461  Kraków Son of Kazimieras Jogailaitis and Elisabeth of Austria || Helena of Moscow  No children|| 19 August 1506  Vilnius  Aged 45 || Son of Casimir IV Jagiellon
|- 1263 –  1265||||||  ||
|King of Poland and Grand Duke Sigismund I the Old 8 December 1506–1 April 1548||||   || 1 January 1467  Kozienice Son of Kazimieras Jogailaitis and Elisabeth of Austria  ||  Barbara Zápolya  2 children   Bona Sforza  6 children|| 1 April 1548  Kraków  Aged 81 || Son of Casimir IV Jagiellon
|- 1263 –  1265||||||  ||
|King of Poland and Grand Duke  1 April 1548–7 July 1572 ||||   || 1 August 1520  Kraków Son of Žygimantas the Oldand Bona Sforza ||  Elisabeth of Austria  No children   Barbara Radziwiłł  No children   Catherine of Austria  No children|| 7 July 1572  Knyszyn  Aged 51 || Son of Sigismund I
|-
! colspan="7" |Union of Lublin signed in 1569Poland and Lithuania are united into a single Commonwealth.
|- 1263 –  1265||||||  ||
|}

House of Urach (1918) 

|-
|King-elect   – ||||   || 30 May 1864  Monaco Son of Wilhelm, 1st Duke of Urach and Princess Florestine of Monaco ||  Duchess Amalie in Bavaria  9 children   Princess Wiltrud of Bavaria  No children|| 24 March 1928  Rapallo  Aged 63 || De jure restoration  Offered by the Lithuanian Council  Offer withdrawn
|-
|}

Timeline of Lithuanian monarchs

Union of Lublin 

In 1564, King of Poland and Grand Duke of Lithuania Sigismund II Augustus renounced his rights to the hereditary Lithuanian throne—the separate inauguration ceremony and insignia for Grand Duke of Lithuania were abolished. On July 1, 1569,  Sigismund II Augustus united both of the countries into a single bi-federation, known as the Polish–Lithuanian Commonwealth, which had existed for the next 226 years. The Union included constitutional changes such as creating a formal elective monarchy, which would simultaneously reign over both parties. Following the death of Sigismund II in 1572, the title "Grand Duke of Lithuania" was merged with the Polish Crown on accession to the throne, thus losing its former institutional significance. During the Deluge of the Second Northern War, the Commonwealth temporarily disintegrated in 1655 when the magnates of the Grand Duchy of Lithuania signed the Union of Kėdainiai with the Swedish Empire and became its protectorate with Charles X Gustav serving as Grand Duke of Lithuania. However, it was short-lived due to Sweden losing the war. The Commonwealth permanently ceased to exist in 1795, following its third partition by the neighbouring powers, Prussia, Russia and Austria. Following the partitions, the lands of ethnic Lithuania were divided—Lithuania proper became a part of the Russian Empire while Sudovia became a part of the Kingdom of Prussia.

History of the monarchy

Kingdom of Lithuania under Mindaugas I 

As the conquests of Prussia by the Teutonic Order and of Livonia by the Livonian Brothers were coming to an end, both Catholic religious orders began posing an existential threat to then-pagan Lithuania. In response, Duke Mindaugas, who by then had managed to strengthen his grip in various Baltic and Slavic lands, sought to consolidate power and unite Lithuania into one political entity, convert to Christianity, and become king. In 1250 or 1251, he was baptised as a Roman Catholic. In 1253, probably in Vilnius or Novogrudok, he and his wife Morta were crowned King and Queen, thus establishing a short-lived alliance with the Livonian Order. This laid the basis for the international recongnition of the newly created Kingdom of Lithuania as a Western country.

Attempts of coronation in the Grand Duchy of Lithuania 

Some historical documents suggest that at the time of signing the Treaty of Salynas in 1398, Lithuanian nobles had acknowledged Vytautas as their King as a symbolic declaration of allegiance. Vytautas himself sought to officially establish his reign by coronation at least three times. However, all three attempts were unsuccessful because the political situation was much more complicated—by this point the Grand Duchy of Lithuania and the Kingdom of Poland were under a joint rule of Grand Duke of Lithuania and King of Poland Jogaila (Władysław II Jagiełło) with the Crown being in Kraków, Poland. As a consequence, the idea of a fully-fledged Lithuanian monarchy as well as Poland losing its influence over its neighbour was met with fierce resistance from the Polish nobles. The first time coronation was planned on 8 September 1430, but after one of the delegations that transported the crown learned that the first delegation was robbed on its way to Lithuania, they returned to Nuremberg. In the same year of October, Vytautas up until his death had planned his coronation at least two more times but with no success.

In 1526, the Lithuanian Council of Lords suggested King Sigismund II Augustus to grant the Grand Duchy of Lithuania the status of a kingdom, but such a proposal was rejected by the ruling Jagiellonian dynasty.

Kingdom of Lithuania (1918) de jure under Mindaugas II 

During the First World War, the German Empire wanted Lithuania proper to be annexed and become a part of either Prussia or Saxony, which for 123 years remained to be a part of the Russian Empire following the Third Partition of the Polish−Lithuanian Commonwealth in 1795. In an attempt to avoid becoming a province but remain on good terms with Germany, the Council of Lithuania decided to establish a separate constitutional monarchy with Wilhelm von Urach as King with his residence being in Verkiai Palace. According to the twelve-point document resembling the rudiments of a Constitution, the Kingdom of Lithuania was supposed to have had a bicameral legislature with a representative role of the monarch. Wilhelm von Urach was also presented with conditions such as adopting the title of Mindaugas II, letting his children to a Lithuanian school, only appointing courtiers, ministers and other high-ranking public officials who are Lithuanian citizens and speak the country's official language as well as not leaving the state for more than two months per year without the permission of the government. However, as the war was coming to an end, it became clear that Germany would lose the war. On October 5, 1918, in the Reichstag the new Chancellor of Germany Maximilian of Baden announced that his state acknowledged the right of nations to self-determination and supported their efforts of becoming independent countries. Soon afterwards, Germany expressed its official support for the independence of Lithuania. Furthermore, the diplomats of France had also unambiguously proclaimed to the Council of Lithuania and the Parliament that having a monarch of German descent would be seen as unacceptable. On November 2, 1918, as it became apparent that King-elect Mindaugas himself was hesitant to arrive in Lithuania for his coronation due to political unrest, the Council decided to abandon the idea of being a satellite monarchy and establish a fully independent republic instead.

Monarchism in present-day Lithuania 
Although currently there are no monarchist parties in modern Lithuania, there is a monarchist movement, which is in favor of re-establishing the short-lived monarchy of 1918. The movement alongside the Lithuanian Royal Union of Nobility believe that the current Lithuanian state did not undergo all of the complicated and necessary procedures to truly abolish the Lithuanian monarchy. According to the senate marshal of the organization "Palace of the Kingdom of Lithuania", Stanislovas Švedarauskas:Can we present the specific date when the Kingdom of Lithuania of the Middle Ages ceased to exist and when did the Lithuanian 20th-century constitutional monarchy end? In the words of historians, when Mindaugas I died in 1263, the Kingdom had disappeared as well. However, after almost 100 years, in the 14th century, Gediminas would send his letters proclaiming to be "King of Lithuanians and many Ruthenians." In November 1918, the State Council left the question of Mindaugas II to the Constituent Assembly. And while it is true that the latter declared Lithuania to be a democratic republic on May 15, 1920, I have never heard of the Constituent Assembly officially denouncing the State Council's declaration of July 11, 1918, which called to create a constitutional monarchy in Lithuania and invite Mindaugas II to take his throne."For Lithuania it is necessary to restore the monarchical institution, which would unite the nation and be a standard of Western welfare in its highest quality. The constitutional monarchy can make Lithuania a welfare state and save the country from a deep moral crisis," he added.

However, political commentator Česlovas Iškauskas has responded to such claims, by saying:In 1918, Germany exerted great influence. But now the idea of re-establishing the constitutional monarchy as well as the activities of the "Palace of the Kingdom of Lithuania" to me seems like a game when you have nothing better to do. At the moment Lithuania has much more important issues—it needs to think how to withstand current threats, not about a new monarchy.Prince Inigo von Urach, the grandson of Wilhelm von Urach (Mindaugas II), claims that according to Almanach de Gotha he remains to be the rightful claimant to the Lithuanian throne and is willing to become King of Lithuania, if the nation wants him to. To quote him from an interview for LRT, "It's not my thing to decide it [the idea of officially being crowned King], that's the thing of the population here, of the citizens of Lithuania. It's not my thing [to decide]. But I promise—if they want me, I would be ready for this job." He also mentioned that Wilhelm von Urach expressed his will in his Testament of "keeping the claim of the throne" of Lithuania as well as Monaco.

Notes

References 

Kings of Lithuania
Lithuanian monarchy